Mary J. Gregor (January 1, 1928 – October 31, 1994) was an American author, translator, and professor. 

She was a Kant scholar and Professor Emeritus of Philosophy at San Diego State University, best known for translating the works of the German philosopher Immanuel Kant.

Allen W. Wood has recognized her translations as characterized "not only by meticulous linguistic accuracy and scholarly erudition but also by an unfailing sense of style and an uncanny ability to render Kant's meaning into readable and even elegant English".

Publications 
 Gregor, Mary J. (1963). Laws of Freedom: A Study of Kant's Method of Applying the Categorical Imperative in the Metaphysik der Sitten, Blackwell, 206 pages.

Translations of Kant's work 
 (1964) The Doctrine of Virtue.
 (1974) Anthropology from a Pragmatic Standpoint. .
 (1979) The Conflict of the Faculties. 
 (1985) On the Philosopher's Medicine of the Body. 
 (1991) Metaphysics of Morals. Cambridge: Cambridge University Press. 
 (1997) Groundwork of the Metaphysics of Morals. Cambridge: Cambridge University Press.

References 

1928 births
1994 deaths
San Diego State University faculty
Kantian philosophers
American women philosophers
20th-century American philosophers
American translators
Translators from German
20th-century American women writers
20th-century translators
American women non-fiction writers